Kumakwane is a village in Kweneng District of Botswana. It is located 25 km west of the capital of Botswana, Gaborone. The population was 9,595 in 2011 census.

References

Kweneng District
Villages in Botswana